The SPDR S&P 500 ETF trust is an exchange-traded fund which trades on the NYSE Arca under the symbol SPY. SPDR is an acronym for the Standard & Poor's Depositary Receipts, the former name of the ETF. It is designed to track the S&P 500 stock market index.  This fund is the largest and oldest ETF in the world. SPDR is a trademark of Standard and Poor's Financial Services LLC, a subsidiary of S&P Global. The ETF's CUSIP is 78462F103 and its ISIN is US78462F1030. The trustee of the SPDR S&P 500 ETF Trust is State Street Bank and Trust Company.  The fund has a net expense ratio of 0.0945%. The value of one share of the ETF is worth approximately 1/10 of the cash S&P 500's current level. On December 1, 2021, the 30-Day average daily volume range for the past 5 years was 82.45 million shares, making it the ETF with the largest trading volume. The sponsor is SPDR Services LLC, a wholly owned subsidiary of American Stock Exchange LLC. Dividends are distributed quarterly, and are based on the accumulated stock dividends held in trust, less any expenses of the trust.  The trust seeks to provide investment results that, before expenses, correspond generally to the price and yield performance of the S&P 500 index.

History

The Standard & Poor's Depositary Receipts were launched by Boston asset manager State Street Global Advisors (SSgA) on January 22, 1993, as the first exchange-traded fund in the United States (preceded by the short-lived Index Participation Shares that launched in 1989); and are part of the SPDRs ETF chain.  
Designed and developed by American Stock Exchange executives Nathan Most and Steven Bloom, the fund first traded on that market, but has since been listed elsewhere, including the New York Stock Exchange.

Competition
Other ETFs that are based on the S&P 500 index include:

 Vanguard S&P 500 ETF
 iShares S&P 500 Index

Performance 
Returns of SPY by fiscal year per SEC EDGAR filings.  The trust ends its fiscal year on September 30. The 5-Year and 10-Year Average (Avg) Annual Return results in the table below include reinvestment of distributions (typically dividends) from the trust.

See also
List of exchange-traded funds
Collective investment scheme

References 

Exchange-traded funds